Mount Kauffman is a prominent mountain,  high, that surmounts the northwest end of the Ames Range in Marie Byrd Land, Antarctica. It was mapped by the United States Geological Survey from surveys and U.S. Navy air photos, 1959–65, and named by the Advisory Committee on Antarctic Names for Commander S.K. Kauffman, U.S. Navy, a staff civil engineering officer who supervised the planning and building of Plateau Station, 1965–66.

It is connected to Mount Kosciusko by Gardiner Ridge which is at one end of Brown Valley.

Minor fumarolic activity was observed in 1977.

References

Volcanoes of Marie Byrd Land
Polygenetic shield volcanoes
Calderas of Antarctica
Ames Range
Miocene shield volcanoes